Buenoa burtsa is a species of backswimmer first found in Colombia's Pacific coast.

References

Notonectidae
Insects described in 2010
Arthropods of Colombia